Costin Miereanu (born 27 February 1943) is a French composer and musicologist  of Romanian birth.

Biography
Miereanu was born in Bucharest and studied at the Music Academy there from 1960 to 1966 with Alfred Mendelsohn, Tiberiu Ola, Ștefan Niculescu, Dan Constantinescu, Myriam Marbe, Aurel Stroe, Anton Vieru, and Octavian Lazăr Cosma, and later at the École des Hautes Études et Sciences Sociales, at the Schola Cantorum, and at Paris 8 University Vincennes-Saint-Denis, where he was awarded first prizes in writing, analysis, music history, esthetics, orchestration, and composition) and earned a Doctor of Letters and a Doctor of Musical Semiotics. Between 1967 and 1969, he was a student of Karlheinz Stockhausen, György Ligeti, and Ehrhard Karkoschka at the Internationale Ferienkurse für neue Musik in Darmstadt. In 1977, he became a French citizen. Since 1981, he has been Professor of Philosophy, Aesthetics, and the Science of Art at the Sorbonne.

Miereanu evolved his compositional style featuring a sensuous sonic fabric by combining of Erik Satie's techniques with an abstraction of Romanian traditional music. Many of his complex and often virtuoso works include visual components. Miereanu has composed aleatoric works, compositions in the style of musique concrète, music for orchestra and chamber orchestra, often using pre-recorded tape material, as well as music for theatre. He was awarded the prize of the European Cultural Foundation 1967, the Prix Enescu (1974), and the Prix de la Partition Pédagogique of the French Composers’ Association (SACEM).

Portions translated from the German and French Wikipedias

Works
Monostructure I, for two orchestras
Monostructure II, for strings, brass, and tape
Das Ende krönt das Werk, for piano and six instrumental groups
In der Nacht der Zeiten, aleatoric music for instruments and tape
Couleurs du temps I, for string orchestra
Couleurs du tempsII for string quartet and tape (1968)
Monostructures I, for brass and strings (1966)
Couleurs du temps III for double string quartet and double bass
Finis coronat opus, for piano and six instrumental groups (1966)
Espaces II for twenty stringed instruments, piano, and tape (1967–69)
Espace dernier, aleatoric music for choir, six instrumental groups, and tape (1966–69)
Rosario, for large orchestra (1973–76)
Domingo, for vocal quintet and variable instruments (1974)
Planetarium, for two flutes, trombone, and two percussionists (1975)
Raum jenseits von gestern, aleatoric music for chamber orchestra
L'Avenir est dans les œufs, opera (1980)
Le jardin de sécrets, for soprano, alto flute or viola, bass clarinet, trombone, piano, and accordion or electric organ (1980)
Cuivres célestes, for brass quintet, two percussionists, and strings (1981)
Labyrinthes d’Adrien, for soprano and ensemble (1981)
Miroirs célestes, for orchestra (1981–83)
Kammerkonzert, for saxophone and nine instruments (1985)
Doppel(kammer)konzert, for saxophone, percussion, and chamber orchestra (1985)
D’un régard moiré, for woodwind quartet, string trio, double bass, piano, and percussion (1988)
Sextuplum, for six percussionists (1988–89)
Ricochets, saxophone(s), electric guitar, bass guitar, synthesizer, and percussion (1989)
D’un source oubliée, for harpsichord and string sextet (1989)
Un temps sans mémoire, for orchestra (1989–92)
Immersion, for saxophone(s) and tape (1990)
La Porte du paradis, lyric fantasie (1991)
De humani corporis fabbrica, ballet (1992)
Les miroirs invisibles, for string sextet (1992)
Vol du temps, canticum sacrum in memoriam Jean-Pierre Ouvrard, for mixed choir a cappella, or mixed choir and three percussionists (1993)
Solo III, for solo violin (1995)
Solo IV, rythmodies, for amplified basson (1995)
Solo V, for oboe, or cor anglais, or baritone oboe (1995)
Solo VI, for solo cello (1995)
Solo VII, for solo viola (1995)
Orison, ballet (1999)
Symphony No. 3 "Blick auf die Frühe" (2001)

References

Living people
Musicians from Bucharest
Romanian emigrants to France
French classical composers
French male classical composers
University of Paris alumni
20th-century classical composers
21st-century classical composers
20th-century French musicologists
21st-century French musicologists
1943 births
Gaudeamus Composition Competition prize-winners
Pupils of Karlheinz Stockhausen
20th-century French composers
21st-century French composers
20th-century French male musicians
21st-century French male musicians